American Water Works Association (AWWA) is an international non-profit, scientific and educational association founded to improve water quality and supply. Established in 1881, it is a lobbying organization representing 
a membership (as of 2012) of around 50,000 members worldwide.

In reviewing the success of the Safe Drinking Water Act after 1974, senior EPA officials cite the vital role that AWWA played as kind of a non‐threatening meeting ground, particularly at the local level.

AWWA members include: water utilities, treatment plant operators and managers, scientists, environmentalists, manufacturers, academics, regulators, and others with an interest in water supply and public health. AWWA works through advocacy, communications, conferences, education and training, science and technology, and local action among 43 AWWA Sections throughout North America.

Publications and conferences
To broaden distribution of information on water and related subjects, AWWA publishes the periodicals Journal AWWA and Opflow.  AWWA also publishes a variety of books, training manuals, standards, reports and videos for use by water professionals and others.  The Association also hosts an annual conference and exposition for the entire organization each summer in North America. Section conferences are also held in all parts of North America. Specialty conferences are held throughout the year on topics including water quality, distribution systems and utility management.  Proceedings of the annual and specialty conferences are published by AWWA.

Water industry resources
Through the Partnership for Safe Water AWWA also works with the United States Environmental Protection Agency and other water organizations to help water providers optimize system performance beyond existing regulatory levels.

AWWA offers opportunities for people to meet, learn, and network at the international, national, and section levels. In addition to publications and conferences for water professionals, AWWA hosts a variety of workshops, symposia, teleconferences, and programs focused on specific aspects of water stewardship.  In cooperation with other professional associations, AWWA is a resource for water professionals’ continuing education and development.

Awards
AWWA presents a number of awards every year to individuals who provide notable service to the drinking water community.  Among the major awards given are the Abel Wolman Award of Excellence, the George Warren Fuller Award, and the Dr. John L. Leal Award.

Water standards development
In 1908, AWWA began developing industry standards for products, processes and best practices. The AWWA Standards Program is recognized internationally as a source for scientific and management reference resources for the water community. Currently, there are over 150 AWWA Standards covering filtration materials, treatment chemicals, disinfection practices, meters, valves, utility management practices, storage tanks, pumps, and ductile iron, steel, concrete, asbestos-cement, and plastic pipe and fittings.  Standing committees periodically review and update the standards as required.

In May 1985, the United States Environmental Protection Agency entered into a cooperative agreement with a consortium led by NSF International to develop voluntary third-party consensus standards and a certification program for all direct and indirect drinking water additives. Other members of the consortium include AWWA. The consortium is responsible for the cooperative effort of manufacturers, regulators, product users and other interested parties that develop and maintain the NSF standards.

Water for People
In February 1991, AWWA founded Water For People, a non-profit international development organization that helps people in developing countries improve their quality of life by supporting the development of locally sustainable drinking water resources, sanitation facilities, and health and hygiene education programs.

Drinking Water Week
For more than 35 years, AWWA has set aside a week in the spring to recognize the importance of safe drinking water throughout North America.  In 1988, AWWA brought the event to the attention of the US government and formed a coalition along with the League of Women Voters, the Association of State Drinking Water Administrators and the US Environmental Protection Agency. Subsequently, AWWA worked with Representative Robert Roe and Senator Dennis DeConcini to sponsor a resolution naming the first week of May as "Drinking Water Week." In 1988, a joint congressional resolution declaration was passed and signed by President Ronald Reagan.

Sections
AWWA is an umbrella organization for 43 sections, each of whom represents a specific geographic region. There are 37 AWWA sections in the United States, 5 Canadian sections, and one each in Mexico and Puerto Rico.

AWWA launched AWWAIndia, its first international community, in 2015. AWWAIndia's headquarters office is located in Mumbai, India.

See also

 American Water Landmark
 Water Environment Federation
 Water For People
 Water management
 Water supply and sanitation in the United States

References

Further reading
EPA Alumni Association: Drinking Water, Half Century of Progress – a brief history of U.S. efforts to protect drinking water

External links
 
 History of AWWA
 History of Drinking Water in U.S. and the Story of AWWA (video)
 Drinking Water Week
 DrinkTap.org

Professional associations based in the United States
Environmental management-related professional associations
Environmental engineering
Hydraulic engineering
Water supply and sanitation in the United States